Choreocolax polysiphoniae is a minute marine parasitic alga in the division Rhodophyta.

Description
This small parasitic alga grows on the red alga Polysiphonia lanosa. It grows as an irregular sphere on the fronds of the alga, reaching no more than 1 mm in extent.

Habitat
Parasitic on Polysiphonia lanosa, the filaments grow into the host.

Distribution
The species has been reported from North Russia and the Pacific. In Ireland it has been confidently recorded from counties Down, Antrim and Waterford and at scattered sites around the British Isles including the Shetland Islands.

Reproduction
Cruciate tetrasporangia are produced all year round in the cortex. The gametangial are dioecious and are produced in spring and summer.

References

Ceramiales
Parasitic eukaryotes
Species described in 1875